Akshay Kumar is an Indian naturalised Canadian actor, television presenter and film producer who works in Hindi-language films. He appeared as unnoticed minor role in the 1987 Indian film Aaj. Although He debuted in a leading role with Saugandh (1991) before breakthrough with the suspense thriller Khiladi (1992), first film of the Khiladi series. He established himself as an action hero with Deedar (1992), Mohra (1994), Main Khiladi Tu Anari (1994), Suhaag (1994), Khiladiyon Ka Khiladi (1996) and earned his first Filmfare Awards nominations for the romantic films Yeh Dillagi (1994) and Dil To Pagal Hai (1997). However, several other of his 90s releases performed poorly at the box office leading to a brief setback in his film career.

The hit crime drama Jaanwar (1999) met with critical acclaim and marked his comeback. In 2000, Kumar worked in Priyadarshan's comedy Hera Pheri and the love triangle Dhadkan. He played a negative role in Ajnabee (2001) to win the Filmfare Best Villain Award and appeared in Andaaz (2003), Aitraaz (2004), Khakee (2004) and Waqt (2005). Comedy roles in the financial hits Mujhse Shaadi Karogi (2004), Garam Masala (2005), Bhagam Bhag (2006), Phir Hera Pheri (2006), Welcome (2007), Bhool Bhulaiyaa (2007), Singh Is Kinng (2008), Housefull (2010) and Tees Maar Khan (2010) earned him widespread recognition in slapstick comic genre and he won the Filmfare Best Comedian Award for Garam Masala. In 2004, he also presented the television series Seven Deadly Arts with Akshay Kumar.

In 2007, Kumar ruled the box office with his all four comedy films Welcome, Bhool Bhulaiyaa, Heyy Babyy and Namastey London. In 2008, he founded the Hari Om Entertainment production company, and hosted the first season of the reality game show Fear Factor: Khatron Ke Khiladi. Next year he was honoured with the Padma Shri, India's fourth highest civilian award, for his services to the Indian film industry. Kumar hosted the first season of MasterChef India in 2010. In 2011 he founded another production company Grazing Goat Pictures, and produced the Indo-Canadian hockey-based film Breakaway, which became the highest grossing cross-cultural film at the Canadian box office. He again conquered at the domestic box office in 2012 with financial hits like the masala film Rowdy Rathore, the comedies Housefull 2 and Khiladi 786, and the satire OMG – Oh My God! with the former two being his first films to enter 100 Crore Club.

Shortly thereafter, Kumar established a great box office pull with multiple critically or commercially successful projects like heist film Special 26 (2013), the action thrillers Holiday (2014) and Airlift (2016), the spy drama Baby (2015), the masala film Gabbar Is Back (2015), the comedies Singh Is Bliing (2015) and Housefull 3 (2016), the crime thriller Rustom (2016), the dramas Jolly LLB 2 (2017), Toilet: Ek Prem Katha (2017) and Padman (2018), the sports film Gold (2018) and the war film Kesari (2019); for Rustom, he won National Film Award for Best Actor. He hosted Dare 2 Dance in 2014 and debuted in Tamil cinema with a negative role in India's most expensive film budgeted at 550 crore, the sci-fi extravaganza 2.0 (2018) which is the fifth highest-grossing Indian film. In 2019 he made a big record by delivering three consecutive 200 Crore Club films with Mission Mangal, Housefull 4 and Good Newwz in additional to the 150 Crore Club grosser Kesari. This was followed by his titular role as an ATS chief in Rohit Shetty's Cop Universe film Sooryavanshi (2021), the highest-grossing Hindi film of 2021.

Film

Television

Music video

Dubbing artist

See also 
 List of awards and nominations received by Akshay Kumar

Notes

References

External links 
 

Indian filmographies
Male actor filmographies
Filmography
Canadian filmographies